Sciatic foramen can refer to:
 Greater sciatic foramen (foramen ischiadicum majus)
 Lesser sciatic foramen (foramen ischiadicum minus)